Luxtorpeda is a Polish rock band, founded in 2010. The current line-up consists of Robert 'Litza' Friedrich (vocals, guitar), Robert 'Drężmak' Drężek (guitar), Krzysztof 'Kmieta' Kmiecik (bass), Tomasz 'Krzyżyk' Krzyżaniak (drums), and Przemysław 'Hans' Frencel (vocals). The band has released seven studio albums, Luxtorpeda (2011), Robaki (2012), A morał tej historii mógłby być taki, mimo że cukrowe, to jednak buraki (2014), MYWASWYNAS (2016), Anno Domini MMXX (2020), Elekroluxtorpeda (2021) and Omega (2022).

History
Luxtorpeda was founded in 2010 in Poznań by Robert Friedrich, guitarist of several popular bands (Turbo, Kazik Na Żywo, Acid Drinkers, 2Tm2,3, Arka Noego). He was joined by guitarist Robert Drężek, bassist Krzysztof Kmiecik, and drummer Tomasz Krzyżaniak, who had played with Armia and Turbo. In 2011, the band was joined by Przemysław Frencel, a rapper of Pięć Dwa Dębiec.

On May 9, 2011, the band released its debut album, titled Luxtorpeda, with a hit song "Autystyczny". The album debuted at number 15 on the Polish sales chart OLiS. It was named the 'Album of the Year' by Teraz Rock magazine in 2012, and the band won several other awards ('Debut of the Year', 'Band of the Year', and 'Song of the Year' and 'Music Video of the Year' for "Autystyczny").

On May 9, 2012, Luxtorpeda released its second album, Robaki, which debuted at number one in Poland.

The band's third record, titled A morał tej historii mógłby być taki, mimo że cukrowe, to jednak buraki, was released on April 1, 2014. It is promoted by the lead radio single "Mambałaga", accompanied by a music video. In its first week, the album charted at number three in Poland, winning with Shakira's self-titled tenth studio album which also debuted that week. The following week, it peaked at number one.

Band members
Robert Friedrich – vocals, guitar (2010–present)
Robert Drężek – guitar (2010–present)
Krzysztof Kmiecik – bass (2010–present)
Tomasz Krzyżaniak – drums (2010–present)
Przemysław Frencel – vocals (2011–present)

Discography

Studio albums

Live albums

Video albums

Music videos

References

External links 
 
 Luxtorpeda on Myspace
 Youtube video of the song Autystyczny
 Youtube video of the song Niezalogowany

Polish rock music groups
Musical groups established in 2010
2010 establishments in Poland